Xianshuigu, formerly known as Seen-shwuy Kow, is a town in Jinnan District, Tianjin, People's Republic of China.

History

References

Towns in Tianjin